Owl Rock is a  elevation sandstone summit located south of Monument Valley, in northeast Arizona. Its nearest higher neighbor is Agathla Peak,  to the east-northeast, on the opposite side of this highway. Precipitation runoff from this feature drains into El Capitan Wash, which is part of the San Juan River drainage basin. The first ascent of Owl Rock was made in April 1966 by Fred Beckey and Harvey Carter by climbing cracks on the west face, and then bolting up a smooth south nose to the summit. They employed 20 pitons and 14 bolts on this route called Warpath. The descriptive name stems from its uncanny resemblance to an owl when viewed from the east. This feature is known as Bee 'Adizí in Navajo language meaning "spindle", and this sacred place is considered to be a spindle left behind by the Holy People. A newer name for it is Tsé Ts'óózí, meaning "Slim Rock".

This Owl Rock is not to be confused with another located in Arches National Park in Utah.

Geology
Owl Rock is a red spire composed of Jurassic Wingate Sandstone which is a hard, fine-grained rock which is great for rock climbing, in contrast to the towers and buttes in nearby Monument Valley which have a different composition, de Chelly sandstone. Owl Rock stands atop Tyende Mesa which is formed of the Triassic Chinle Formation. The Owl Rock Member of the Chinle Formation, composed of cherty limestone and limestone conglomerate beds alternating with claystone, mudstone, and siltstone beds, forms the upper half of the mesa, and it overlays the Petrified Forest Member of the lower half. The Owl Rock Member is best exposed at its type locality near the base of Owl Rock. Here the member crops out and the resistant limestone beds form a series of jutting ledges that serve partly in protecting the underlying strata. The limestone beds are
very resistant to erosion, forming thin ledges interrupting the slopes weathered from the dominant siltstone interbeds. The Owl Rock Member ranges in thickness from approximately 120 to 166 feet, and at Owl Rock the member is 166 feet thick.

Climate
Spring and fall are the most favorable seasons to visit Owl Rock. According to the Köppen climate classification system, it is located in a semi-arid climate zone with cold winters and hot summers. Summers average 54 days above  annually, and highs rarely exceed . Summer nights are comfortably cool, and temperatures drop quickly after sunset. Winters are cold, but daytime highs are usually above freezing. Winter temperatures below  are uncommon, though possible.

Gallery

See also
 Colorado Plateau
 List of rock formations in the United States

References

External links
 Weather forecast: Owl Rock

Colorado Plateau
Landforms of Navajo County, Arizona
Geography of the Navajo Nation
Geography of Navajo County, Arizona
Rock formations of Arizona
Sandstone formations of the United States
Religious places of the indigenous peoples of North America